Paraspilarctia magna is a moth of the family Erebidae. It was described by Alfred Ernest Wileman in 1910. It is found in Taiwan.

References

Spilosomina
Moths described in 1910
Moths of Taiwan
Endemic fauna of Taiwan